The Stoke Poges Memorial Gardens are memorial gardens in Stoke Poges, Buckinghamshire, England. The gardens are listed Grade I on the Register of Historic Parks and Gardens. The gardens are adjacent to the Church of St Giles, Stoke Poges.

The Memorial Gardens were founded in 1935 by Sir Noel Mobbs to ensure "the maintenance in perpetuity of the peace, quietness and beauty of the ancient church and churchyard". The gardens were landscaped by Edward White and contain a number of private plots for the interment of ashes, within a larger, Grade I listed park. The ashes of the film director Alexander Korda, aviation pioneer John Moore-Brabazon, 1st Baron Brabazon of Tara and the broadcaster Kenneth Horne, among others, are interred in the garden.

References

External links

1935 establishments in England
Grade I listed parks and gardens in Buckinghamshire